Bozeman High School (or BHS) is a public high school for grades 9 through 12 located in Bozeman, Montana. It is the second-oldest high school in the state of Montana. In 2011, it had an enrollment of roughly 1,844 students,  and was accredited by the Northwest Accreditation Association.

History
Bozeman established its high school  in 1877, housing it (along with other grades) in the newly built West Side School at 300 West Babcock. Students were few, and due to dropouts the high school did not graduate its first class until 1882. In 1937, a new county high school building, Gallatin County High School, was constructed at 404 West Main Street.

Later renamed the Willson School (after its architect, Fred Willson), GCHS was discontinued in 1956 when the city of Bozeman constructed a new city high school, a mile west at 205 North 11th Avenue, designed by both Willson and Oswald Berg. This building serves as the current Bozeman High School, while the 1937 building was used to house Bridger Alternative High School until 2009.  Bridger Alternative now resides in an old wing of the high school after the school district removed Chief Joseph Middle School, which was connected to the high school, to a different location. The old middle school was remodeled slightly with a new cafeteria and main offices and library, now called north campus, or "N Wing" to students.

Curriculum and awards
In 2002, BHS employed four administrators and 129 teachers and support staff. Most of the teaching faculty have master’s degrees.

Bozeman High School offers two diplomas: the General Diploma and the Honors Diploma. More than half of the students in 2002 graduated with the College Prep Diploma. BHS offers courses in art, biomedical sciences, business education, engineering, English, foreign languages, health enhancement (health education and physical education), home economics, industrial arts, mathematics, music, science, and social studies. It also offers Advanced Placement courses in American history, art, biology, calculus, chemistry, English literature and composition, European history, French, German, human geography, government, microeconomics, music theory, physics, psychology, Spanish, statistics, and world history. In the early 2000s, Bozeman High School students scored consistently higher on the SAT than other students in Montana and nationally.

In 1989 and again in 1993, Bozeman High School was named a Blue Ribbon School of Excellence by the United States Department of Education. In 1994 and 1996 Redbook magazine named Bozeman High School one of the best high schools in the nation.

U.S. News & World Report ranks Bozeman High School 570 on its 2013 Best High Schools ranking.  In 2010, Newsweek Magazine included Bozeman High School in its annual list of America's Best High Schools for the fifth time since 2003. The magazine ranked BHS 675 on its list of 1,600 top schools, placing it in the top 3% of high schools in the nation.

Campus and athletics
The  campus includes a  swimming pool that, by a lease arrangement from the city, provides swimming opportunities for students. The campus has a 10-lane all-weather running track for use in the health enhancement curriculum as well as in extracurricular activities. It is the largest high school in the state. The school's mascot is the hawk.

Athletics
Athletic programs include Cross country, track, softball, cheerleading, football, basketball, volleyball, swimming, wrestling, soccer, and dance. The Hawks are in division AA, the largest division in Montana.

Notable alumni
Brock Coyle, linebacker; Seattle Seahawks, San Francisco 49'ers 
Steve Daines, US Senator
Will Dissly, Seattle Seahawks tight end
Jason R. Dunn, US Attorney for the District of Colorado (2018-2021)
Dane Fletcher, New England Patriots Tampa Bay Buccaneers linebacker
Karen Gibson, US Senate's Sergeant at Arms
Michael McFaul, former US Ambassador to Russia
Stephanie Quayle, musician

References

Bibliography
Burlingame, Merrill G. The Montana Frontier. Bozeman, Mont.: Big Sky Books, 1980.
Mulvaney, Tom. Bozeman and the Gallatin Valley. Charleston, S.C.: Arcadia Publishing, 2009.
Smith, Phyllis. Bozeman and the Gallatin Valley: A History. Helena, Mont.: Falcon Press, 1996.

External links

Public high schools in Montana
Schools in Gallatin County, Montana
1887 establishments in Montana Territory